Hanyang Arsenal was one of the largest and oldest modern arsenals in Chinese history.

History

Originally known as the Hubei Arsenal, it was founded in 1891 by Qing official Zhang Zhidong, who diverted funds from the Nanyang Fleet in Guangdong to build the arsenal. It cost about 250,000 pounds sterling and was built in 4 years. It built magazine-fed rifles, Gruson quick fire guns, and cartridges.

On 14 June 1894, an industrial accident started a fire in the arsenal that destroyed all the equipment and most of the structures in the arsenal, $1,000,000 in damages were reported. In July of the same year rebuilding began, and in August 1895, all was back to normal and the arsenal started production of German M1888 Commission rifles, locally called 7.92 cm Type 88 Mauser rifle (even though the Commission rifle was unrelated to the Mauser), today these rifles are known as the Hanyang 88 or Type 88 rifle. At the same time, ammunition for the rifle were being produced at a rate of 13,000 rounds per month.

500,000 taels were spent annually in the arsenal, which constructed Mauser rifles and used steel from the works around Hanyang. Iron and coal mines surrounded the area. 160,000 Mausers were purchased by the Chinese military, along with mountain guns and small caliber versions. Smokeless powder was produced for guns at a factory next to the arsenal. The arsenal itself built 40 Mausers a day, 6 field guns a month. Every day the following was manufactured: 300 shells, 35,000 rifle cartridges, 1,000 pounds smokeless powder. They were moved via the Yangtze river until reaching Wuchang. Fortifications across China in the interior and on the coast received these weapons.

During the Boxer Uprising of 1900, the arsenal supplied the Boxers with more than 3,000 rifles and 1 million rounds of ammunition.

In 1904, the arsenal made several modifications to their design of the Type 88, and, at the same time, production capacity was expanded to 50 rifles and 12,000 rounds of ammunition per day. For a time in 1910, the arsenal switched to producing the Type 68 rifle, at a rate of 38 per day.

The quality of the firearms produced in this period was generally low, because the local steel foundries were often ill-equipped and badly managed.

Because of its proximity to Wuchang, the revolutionaries, during the Wuchang Uprising of Xinhai Revolution, largely equipped themselves with foreign and locally made weapons stored at this arsenal – some 7,000 rifles, 5 million rounds, 150 pack guns and 2,000 shells. The arsenal, in support of the revolution, switched into full gear and began producing weapons and ammunition day and night. 

The Republic of China expanded the arsenal numerous times, and production soared. Quality, however, remained low. In 1917, a training school was established alongside the arsenal. In 1921, production began on copies of the Browning M1917 and the Mauser M1932 "Broomhandle" pistol. In 1930, the design of the Type 88 was once again modified, extending the bayonet. In 1935, a version of the Maxim gun—the Type 24 HMG—was being produced, based on blueprints from the German M08.

As the Imperial Japanese Army approached Hanyang and Wuhan in 1938, the arsenal was forced to move to Hunan, with parts of its assets transferred to various other arsenals across the country. At Hunan, it continued production of the Type 88 rifle and carbine, and also the Chinese version of the Karabiner 98k, the Chiang Kai-shek rifle otherwise known as the  Type Chungcheng style rifle.

With the Allies' victory in 1945, orders to the arsenal gradually stopped, and, on 1 July 1947, the arsenal was shut down. Much of the arsenal tooling was moved to Chongqing, where it provided the foundation for later arms production there, Chongqing Jianshe being one of these manufacturing concerns. Many of the senior employees transferred to Taiwan and built the basis of today's Taiwanese arsenals.

Firearms produced

Type 88 rifle
Type 68 rifle
Type 24 Chiang Kai-Shek rifle
Type 24 HMG
Mauser C96 pistols in 7.63mm and 7.65mm caliber
Type 30 machine gun
The General Liu rifle, an early semi-automatic rifle, was to be produced at Hanyang, but only a small number of prototypes were actually made.

See also
Chinese Civil War
Second Sino-Japanese War
Self-Strengthening Movement
Sino-German cooperation (1926–1941)
Taiyuan Arsenal
Foochow Arsenal
Great Hsi-Ku Arsenal
Jiangnan Shipyard

References

Military history of China
National Revolutionary Army
Boxer Rebellion
Firearm manufacturers of China
1911 Revolution
Chinese companies established in 1891
1947 disestablishments in China
Arsenals
History of Wuhan
Manufacturing companies established in 1891